S. John Ross may refer to:

S. John Ross (artist) (1919–2008), American born Australian artist and showman
S. John Ross (game designer) (born 1971), American game and graphic designer and writer

See also
John Ross (disambiguation)